Marry Me, or Not? is a 2015 Taiwanese romantic comedy television series created and produced by Eastern Television. Starring Roy Chiu, Ko Chia-yen, Joanne Tseng and Harry Chang, filming began on March 12, 2015 and wrapped up on June 14, 2015. It aired on CTV every Sunday night at 10:00-11:30 pm from November 1, 2015 to February 14, 2016.

Cast

Main cast
Roy Chiu as Hao Meng 郝萌 （Justin）
Ko Chia-yen as Cai Huan Zhen 蔡環真 （Vivienne）
Joanne Tseng as Hao Sheng Nan 郝勝男
Harry Chang as Jiang Qian Yao 江前躍

Supporting cast
Grace Ko as Xia Yu He 夏羽荷
Wang Dao-Nan as Hao Yi Sheng 郝怡生
Akira Chen as Cai Yong Li 蔡宏立
Ke Shu-qin as Wang Yue E 王月娥
Danny Liang as Lin Shu Hong 林書鴻
Peggy Yang as Xin Xian 心嫻
Yu Yue Ru (余月如) as Na Na 娜娜
Li Pei Yu (李霈瑜) as Wen Jia 雯嘉
Li Chung Lin as Ah Xin 阿信
Daniel Chen as Cui Da Zui 崔大嘴
Louis Liu (李霈瑜) as Meng Fu 孟甫
Zhang Bo Sheng (張博盛) as Guai Shou 怪獸
Heaven Hai (海裕芬) as Assistant manager

Cameo
Mickey Huang as Manager Huang
Chung Hsin-Ling as Xiao Dai 小黛
Kimi Hsia as Hsu Ching-ju
Li Ying (李穎) as Sammy
Josie Leung as Ms. Yang
Chung Hsin-yu (莎莎) as Fortune teller's customer
Xu Li Yun (徐麗雲) as Hao Grandma
Chen Bolin as Li Da Lun 李大倫
Ma Jun Lin (馬俊麟) as Veterinarian
Tseng Shi (曾實) as Sun Fu Guo 孫副國
Lance Yu as Mr. Xiao
Esther Wu as Xiao Min 小敏
Paul Hsu as Policemen
Wu Zheng Xun (吳政勳) as Ah B 阿B
Mirza Atif Ali Baig as Huan Zhen's ex-boyfriend
Ha Xiao Yuan (哈孝遠) as Huan Zhen's ex-boyfriend
Lu Yan Ze (盧彥澤) as Huan Zhen's ex-boyfriend
Ti Chih-Chieh as CEO Jin

Soundtrack

Marry Me or Not? Original TV Soundtrack (OST) (必娶女人 電視原聲帶) was released on November 27, 2015 by various artists under HIM International Music Inc. It contains 10 tracks total. The opening theme is track 1 "Love’s Forever" by Real (F.I.R.) feat. Joanne Tseng, while the closing theme is track 2 "Linger On" by Yoga Lin.

Track listing

Songs not featured on the official soundtrack album.
I Won't Like You (我不會喜歡你) by Chen Bolin

Broadcast

Episode ratings
Competing dramas on rival channels airing at the same time slot were:
FTV - Aquarius, Capricorn, Tân Nương Giá Đáo
TTV - Bromance

Awards and nominations

References

External links
Marry Me, or Not? CTV Website 
Marry Me, or Not? ETTV Website  
 

2015 Taiwanese television series debuts
2016 Taiwanese television series endings
China Television original programming
Eastern Television original programming
Taiwanese romance television series
Taiwanese romantic comedy television series
Television shows set in Busan